Steven A. Elmendorf is a lobbyist in Washington, D.C., who was a senior advisor to House Democratic Leader Dick Gephardt for 12 years, serving as his chief of staff after 1997. Elmendorf was also deputy campaign manager for U.S. Senator John Kerry, the 2004 Democratic nominee for president.

He, along with Republican Jack Oliver as his business partner, was previously president at Bryan Cave Strategies L.L.C., a lobbying firm connected with the law firm, Bryan Cave LLP.

Elmendorf later founded Elmendorf/Ryan LLC a government relations and strategic counseling firm he owns along with Jimmy Ryan which represents corporations, trade associations and non profit organizations. Elmedorf/Ryan employs an "all-star team of Democratic revolving-door lobbyists . . . including former top aides to Democratic floor leaders Harry Reid, Dick Gephardt, Steny Hoyer and Nancy Pelosi."

He has been a frequent guest on television talk shows including Hardball with Chris Matthews, CNBC's Capitol Report, Fox News and CNN’s Crossfire. He has lectured at the Institute of Politics at Harvard University’s John F. Kennedy School of Government and at his alma mater, Trinity College in Hartford, Connecticut. Elmendorf is openly gay.

Career
A New Jersey native hailing from Summit, Elmendorf graduated from Trinity College in 1982 and began his career as a field organizer on the Mondale for President campaign. He was later chief of staff for U.S. Representative Dennis Eckart, and a staff aide to Senator Brock Adams.

Elmendorf joined Gephardt's staff in 1992 and became chief of staff in 1997.

He managed the floor for House Democrats and designed the Democratic Caucus’ strategic response to issues including the impeachment of President Bill Clinton, the Clinton 1993 economic program, the Clinton effort to reform health care in 1994, NAFTA, the 1997 Balanced Budget Act, McCain-Feingold campaign finance reform and the Iraq war resolution.

While in the leader’s office, he was named every year by Roll Call newspaper as one of the 50 most powerful staff people on Capitol Hill.

He managed four of Gephardt's successful campaigns for Democratic leader and organized the congressman’s outside political activities at the Democratic Congressional Campaign Committee and at Gephardt's political action committee. Elmendorf was elected by the members of the House of Representatives as a minority officer of the House in the 105th, 106th and 107th Congress, entitling him to the same privileges as former members of the House.

He served as chief of staff and senior advisor for Gephardt’s 2004 Democratic presidential campaign. In 2004, as deputy campaign manager for Kerry’s 2004 presidential bid, Elmendorf was the primary campaign liaison to U.S. senators, members of Congress, governors and mayors. He also supervised the field operations in 21 states and was on the strategic team involved in overall campaign planning and worked in the campaign’s outreach to constituency groups and organized labor. In November 2011, Elmendorf was included on The New Republic's list of Washington's most powerful, least famous people.

2006 elections
In January 2006, Elmendorf was criticized vehemently by some left-wing Democratic bloggers when he was quoted in a Washington Post story as saying, "The bloggers and online donors represent an important resource for the party, but they are not representative of the majority you need to win elections. The trick will be to harness their energy and their money without looking like you are a captive of the activist left." Markos Moulitsas, head of the Daily Kos blog, replied: "Here's notice, any Democrat associated with Elmendorf will be outed. The netroots can then decide for itself whether it wants to provide some of that energy and money to that candidate. There's nothing 'extreme left' with demanding Democrats act like Democrats, no matter how much these out-of-touch and self-important beltway insiders think it is."

Also in 2006, Elmendorf gave his support to U.S. Senator Joe Lieberman's independent re-election bid after Lieberman lost the Democratic primary. Elmendorf was listed on Lieberman's campaign Web site as part of the "national chapter" of "Dems for Joe."

See also
Lobbying in the United States

Notes

See also
David E. Rosenbaum, "A Gephardt Staff Member Finds a New Home", New York Times, January 25, 2004

External links
 Elmendorf Strategies, LLC Web site
 Bryan Cave Strategies Web site

American lobbyists
American political commentators
American campaign managers
Pingry School alumni
Year of birth missing (living people)
Living people